L'Homme au hamac, also referred to as Man in a Hammock, is a painting created in 1913 by the French artist, theorist and writer Albert Gleizes. The work was exhibited at Moderni Umeni, SVU Mánes, Vystava, Prague, February – March 1914, no. 41; and Der Sturm, Berlin, July – August 1914. The painting was reproduced in Guillaume Apollinaire, Paris-Journal, July 4, 1914 (published again in Chroniques d'Art, 1960. p. 405); and Albert Gleizes, L'Épopée, Le Rouge et le Noir, October 1929, p. 81. Stylistically Gleizes' painting exemplifies the principle of mobile perspective laid out in Du "Cubisme", written by himself and French painter Jean Metzinger. Evidence suggests that the man reclining in the hammock is indeed Jean Metzinger. Formerly in the collection of Metzinger, the first owner of the painting, Man in a Hammock forms part of the permanent collection of the Albright-Knox Art Gallery, Buffalo, New York.

Description
Man in a Hammock is an oil painting on canvas with dimensions 130 by 155.5 cm (51.2 x 61.2 inches) signed and dated "Alb Gleizes 13", lower left. Painted in 1913, the work "presents an interesting synthesis of back and forth motion," writes art historian Daniel Robbins (Guggenheim, 1964), "and introduces a composition based on the intersection of powerful diagonals". Man in a Hammock is related to a number of other works, such as a watercolor and a sepia ink over pencil drawing from 1909, a pencil and ink dated 1913, in addition to at least three other works in various media. A large and finished painting of L'Homme au hamac dating from the summer of 1909 is on the reverse of Houses among Trees, 113.5 x 154 cm, 1910. In both the proto-Cubist version and in a small oil sketch (formerly in the collection of Ida Bienert, Dresden) the man wears a large sombrero.

Portrait of Jean Metzinger

The reclining figure is clearly readable. His face is seen both from a profile and frontal view simultaneously. While this property of seeing multiple facial features at once is rare in the work of Gleizes, it is seen quite often in the works of Metzinger. The figure is situated in a landscape setting that recedes to buildings typical of Parisian suburbs around 1910 in the upper center background of the canvas. In the foreground, the sitter's right leg is supported by a Paris-style park chair. The table placed next to the sitters right arm—portrayed as if seen from above in accord with the non-Euclidean geometry first pronounced by Paul Cézanne—supports various elements; a vase, a glass, some fruit (perhaps lemons) and a spoon. The long spoon, according to Christian Briend (Musée National d'Art Moderne, Paris), is a reference to the principle accessory of Metzinger's seminal 1911 Le goûter (Tea Time); dubbed by André Salmon "La Joconde du Cubisme" (The Mona Lisa of Cubism).

Gleizes utilizes a multitude of colors—unlike the limited palette often associated with early Cubism—ranging from large areas of ochre, red, white and blue, surrounding the grisaille figure.
 
The man represented in the painting is very likely a portrait of Jean Metzinger. The book entitled Paroles devant la vie, held prominently by the model was written by Alexandre Mercereau in 1913. Gleizes had collaborated in founding the Abbaye de Créteil, and was very familiar with Mercereau's writings. Metzinger wrote an important text about Mercereau in 1911. It was Mercereau who introduced Gleizes to Metzinger in 1910. Mercereau's publisher, Eugène Figuière, a year earlier had published Du "Cubisme", the Cubist manifesto written by Gleizes and Metzinger.

In Gleizes' painting, one does not merely see a figure swinging in a hammock; one sees multiple aspects of the same figure simultaneously refracted into new pictorial language. Mercereau attempted to represent facets of time in his writings, much as Gleizes and Metzinger attempted to represent facets of space, time and form in their paintings.

Man in a Hammock integrates the man into the landscape, forming a single image by virtue of a non-linear grid. This device is used by Gleizes very skillfully to accommodate all aspects of the scene. Mercereau's book, the still-life next to the sitter, the man, and the environment are all symbols of fundamental importance to Gleizes, an artist who rarely, if ever, contented himself with mundane subjects (a guitar, violin, or a bowl of fruit).

Man in a Hammock is testament to the close association of two artists, Metzinger and Gleizes, and to their shared social, cultural and philosophical conviction that painting represented more than a fleeting glimpse of the world in which they lived, that indeed by showing multiple facets of a subject captured at successive intervals in time simultaneously, a truer more complete image would emerge.

'We feared the dogmas and hermetic ideas, destructive acts disguised as new constructions, before they appeared as we knew they would. Rejecting nothing, we sketched out a traditional curve in French painting from Courbet to ourselves as the latest arrivals, persuaded that the new order cannot be created independently of the permanent order'. (Albert Gleizes, 1917)Two Philosopher-Painters, Albert Gleizes and Kasimir Malevich

Provenance
 Jean Metzinger
 Mme Russo
 Sidney Janis Gallery, 1957
 Purchased by Albright Art Gallery, February 22, 1957

Exhibitions
 Moderni Umeni, S.V.U., Manes, Prague, 1914, no. 41
 Der Sturm, Berlin, July, 1914

Literature
 Guillaume Apollinaire, Paris-Journal, July 4, 1914, cf. Chroniques d'Art, 1960. p. 405 
 Albert Gleizes, L'Epopee, Le Rouge et le Noir, October, 1929, p. 81
 Painting and sculpture from antiquity to 1942, Albright-Knox Art Gallery, Steven A. Nash - 1979
 The Saturday Review, 1965
 Albert Gleizes, 1881-1953: A Retrospective Exhibition, Solomon R. Guggenheim Museum - 1964
 Saturday Review, Henry Seidel Canby, Bernard Augustine De Voto, George Cooper Stevens - 1965
 Painters of the Section d'Or: The Alternatives to Cubism. Exhibition September 27-October 22, 1967, Albright-Knox Art Gallery, Buffalo, New York - 1967
 Gallery Notes, Albright-Knox Art Gallery - 1970
 Masterworks at the Albright-Knox Art Gallery, Albright-Knox Art Gallery, Karen Lee Spaulding - 1999
 125 masterpieces from the collection of the Albright-Knox Art Gallery, Karen Lee Spaulding, Albright-Knox Art Gallery - 1987
 Gallery Notes, Buffalo Fine Arts Academy - 1958
 The Guggenheim Museum collection: paintings, 1880-1945, Solomon R. Guggenheim Museum, Angelica Zander Rudenstine - 1976
 Albert Gleizes: Catalogue Raisonné, Albert Gleizes, Anne Varichon, Daniel Robbins - 1998
 L'Oeil, Georges Bernier, Rosamond Bernier - 1999
 Albert Gleizes et le dessin: 11 December 1970 - 25 January 1971 
 André Dubois, Saint-Étienne (Loire, France). Musée d'art et d'industrie - 1970
 Maurice Raynal: la bande à Picasso, David Raynal - 2008
 Gallery Notes, Albright-Knox Art Gallery - 1953
 Œuvres en prose, Guillaume Apollinaire, Michel Décaudin, Pierre Caizergues - 1991
 International Auction Records, 1992

References

External links
 Fondation Albert Gleizes
 Réunion des Musées Nationaux, Grand Palais, Agence photographique

Paintings by Albert Gleizes
Cubist paintings
1913 paintings
Paintings in the collection of the Albright–Knox Art Gallery
20th-century portraits